This article contains information about the literary events and publications of 1822.

Events
March – The Noctes Ambrosianae, imaginary colloquies, begin to appear in Blackwood's Magazine (Edinburgh).
June 16 – Mary Shelley suffers a miscarriage.
July 18 – The body of English poet Percy Bysshe Shelley, is washed up on the beach near Viareggio, ten days after he left Livorno (where he set up The Liberal magazine with Leigh Hunt) for Lerici, where Shelley had been living with his wife Mary; his boat, the Don Juan, had sunk in a storm in the Ligurian Sea. His body is cremated on the beach in the presence of Lord Byron and Edward John Trelawny, who claims to have seized Shelley's heart from the flames.

New books

Fiction
Richard Henry Dana Sr. – Paul Felton
Kenelm Henry Digby – The Broad-Stone of Honour
Sarah Green – Nuptial Discoveries
Jane Harvey – Singularity
Ann Hatton – Guilty or Not Guilty
Washington Irving – Bracebridge Hall
Lady Caroline Lamb – Graham Hamilton
John Neal – Logan, a Family History
Charles Nodier – Trilby, ou le lutin d'Argail
Anna Maria Porter – The Hunters of the Pyrenees
Rosalia St. Clair – Clavering Tower
Sir Walter Scott (as "the author of Waverley")
The Fortunes of Nigel
The Pirate
Catharine Maria Sedgwick – A New England Tale

Children and young people
Hans Christian Andersen – Ghost at Palnatoke's Grave
Charlotte Anley – Influence. A Moral Tale for Young People
Susannah Moodie – Spartacus
Mary Martha Sherwood – The History of Henry Milner
Agnes Strickland – The Moss-House: In Which Many of the Works of Nature Are Rendered a Source of Amusement to Children

Drama 
Franz Grillparzer – The Golden Fleece (Das goldene Vlies)
Alessandro Manzoni – Adelchi

Poetry
Lord Byron – The Vision of Judgment
António Feliciano de Castilho – Primavera
Eleanor Anne Porden – Cœur de Lion
Alexander Pushkin - The Prisoner of the Caucasus  
Percy Bysshe Shelley – Hellas

Non-fiction
Thomas de Quincey – Confessions of an English Opium-Eater
John Claudius Loudon – An Encyclopaedia of Gardening

Births
February 10 – Eliza Lynn Linton, English novelist and journalist (died 1898)
February 22 – Frances Elizabeth Barrow, American author of children's stories (died 1894)
May 26 – Edmond de Goncourt, French literary critic and publisher (died 1896)
December 24 – Matthew Arnold, English poet (died 1888)
Boleslav Markevich, Russian writer (died 1884)

Deaths
March 19 – Józef Wybicki, Polish poet (born 1747)
March 27 – Sir Alexander Boswell, 1st Baronet, Scottish politician, poet, songwriter and antiquary, killed in duel (born 1775)
June 25 – E. T. A. Hoffmann, German Romantic writer (born 1776)
July 8 – Percy Bysshe Shelley, English poet and radical (born 1792)
December 7 – John Aikin, English physician and miscellanist (born 1747)
December 8 – Saul Ascher, German political writer and translator (born 1767)

Awards
Chancellor's Gold Medal – John Henry Bright
Newdigate Prize – A. Barber

References

 
Years of the 19th century in literature